Peninsula Lake in the District Municipality of Muskoka, is one of the (North) Muskoka Lakes.

Peninsula Lake is a mid-sized cold-water lake located just east of Huntsville, Ontario. Municipal jurisdiction is split between the Town of Huntsville and the Township of Lake of Bays. The Lake encompasses a surface area of 868.8 ha (8.6 km²) and a total shoreline of 27.4 km.

The shoreline of Peninsula Lake is generally characterized as being typical of most developed cottage country lakes. The land immediately surrounding Peninsula Lake has predominantly residential uses. However, there are 7 commercial resorts, including Cedar Grove Lodge, one commercial ski hill and one residential condominium.  Other resorts on the lake include Deerhurst Resort and Hidden Valley Resort.  There are two large islands on the lake.  Hills Island, the larger of the two, is situated in the central waters and Wolf Island is located in Wolf Bay at the lake's eastern edge.

There is currently no industrial development, although the area has been heavily logged over the past two centuries.

The G8 summit was held on the lake at the Deerhurst Resort from June 25–26, 2010.

The water level of Peninsula Lake is controlled at two points.  The first control point, which is the outlet of the lake, is the canal that is located between Fairy and Peninsula Lake.  The canal was excavated in 1888 to facilitate access to Peninsula Lake by large steam ships.  Before the canal was created the area consisted of a small stream and wetland.  The second point is a water control structure located at the outlet of Fairy Lake.  This dam was built in 1877 to control the water levels of Fairy and Peninsula Lakes to enhance navigation and logging operations.

See also
List of lakes in Ontario

External links 
 Peninsula Lake Association
 Town of Huntsville
 Lake of Bays

Lakes of the District Municipality of Muskoka